Nedeljko Radosavljević (born 1965) is a Serbian historian and regular contributor to the Historical Institute in Belgrade. 
Graduated from the Department of History at the Faculty of Philosophy in Belgrade with the work Foreign policy of Serbia during the reign of Milan Obrenović in 1993.
M. A. thesis: Archbishopric of Užice and Valjevo 1739-1804, 1999. 
Ph. D. thesis: Church in the Pashaluk of Belgrade under the authority of the Ecumenical Patriarchate between the years of 1766 to 1831 at the Faculty of Philosophy in Banja Luka, 2004.
Worked as an archivist in Historical Archives of Valjevo, at the Faculty of Philosophy in Srpsko Sarajevo, Museum "Sirogojno", Faculty of Philosophy in Niš. 
Working in the Institute of History since 2001. 
As a scholarship-holder of the Ministry of Science and Environmental Protection of the Republic of Serbia he was pursuing his postdoctoral studies at the Institute of History of the Bulgarian Academy of Sciences in Sofia from June to December 2006. He is an associate member of the Matica srpska in Novi Sad, associate on the compilation of the Serbian biographical dictionary of Matica srpska as well as of the Biographical lexicon of the Valjevo region.
 
Field of Research: History of the Serbian Orthodox Church from the 15th to the 19thcenturies; social history of Serbian village and rural population in the 18th and the 19th centuries.
 
Languages: Russian, German, Bulgarian, Italian.

Main works

References

External links

21st-century Serbian historians
1965 births
Living people
University of Belgrade Faculty of Philosophy alumni